Holík (feminine Holíková) is a Czech surname. Notable people with the surname include:

 Andrea Holíková, Czech tennis player
 Bobby Holík (born 1971), retired Czech-American professional ice hockey center
 Jaroslav Holík (born 1942), retired professional ice hockey player
 Jiří Holík (born 1944), retired professional ice hockey player
 Libor Holík, Czech footballer
 Lukáš Holík (born 1992), Czech footballer
 Norbert Holík (born 1972), Paralympian athlete from Slovakia
 Petr Holík (born 1992), Czech ice hockey player
 Vladimír Holík (born 1978), Czech ice hockey player
 Vyachaslaw Holik (born 1989), Belarusian professional footballer

See also
 Holika
 Holiki
 Hollick
 Horlick

Czech-language surnames